, provisional designation , is a bright, sub-kilometer asteroid, classified as near-Earth object and potentially hazardous asteroid of the Apollo group. Based on absolute magnitude, it is the second largest asteroid known to have passed closer than the Moon.

Description 

 was discovered on 7 February 2002 by Lincoln Near-Earth Asteroid Research (LINEAR) at an apparent magnitude of 19 using a  reflecting telescope. The asteroid was listed on Sentry Risk Table with a Torino Scale rating of 1 on 20 March 2002.

With an observation arc of 44 days,  showed a 1 in 9,300 chance of impacting Earth in 2049. It was removed from the Sentry Risk Table on 26 April 2002. It is now known that on 3 September 2049 the asteroid will be  from Earth.

The close approach of 2080 will cause an uncertainty of 4 minutes for the close approach time of 2084.

References

External links 
 
 
 

163132
163132
163132
163132
20140830
20020207